Philip Taylor may refer to:

Philip Taylor (MP), MP for Weymouth and Melcombe Regis (UK Parliament constituency)
Philip Joseph Taylor (born 1931), English rugby union player
Philip Taylor (civil engineer) (1786–1870), English civil engineer
Philip Meadows Taylor (1808-1876), Anglo-Indian administrator and novelist

See also
Phil Taylor (disambiguation)